The Women's individual table tennis – Class 11 tournament at the 2012 Summer Paralympics in London took place from 30 August to 3 September 2012 at ExCeL London. This class was for athletes with intellectual impairment.

In the preliminary stage, athletes competed in two groups of three. Top two in each group qualified for the semi-finals.

Results
All times are local (BST/UTC+1)

Finals

Preliminary round

Group A

30 August, 13:00

31 August, 11:00

31 August, 20:40

Group B

30 August, 13:00

31 August, 11:00

31 August, 20:40

References

WI11
Para